The 2004 UAB Blazers football team represented the University of Alabama at Birmingham (UAB) in the college football season of 2004, and was the fourteenth team fielded by the school. The Blazers' head coach was Watson Brown, who entered his tenth season as UAB's head coach. They played their home games at Legion Field in Birmingham, Alabama, and competed as a member of Conference USA. The Blazers finished their ninth season at the I-A level, and sixth affiliated with a conference with a record of 7–5 (5–3 C-USA). The Blazers also made their first ever bowl appearance at the 2004 Hawaii Bowl where they were defeated 40–59 by Hawaii.

Schedule

References

UAB
UAB Blazers football seasons
UAB Blazers football